The 2012 USA Rugby Men's College 7s National Championship was a seven-a-side rugby union tournament. The competition was held from 30 November – 1 December at Texas A&M University in College Station, Texas and featured 24 college/university teams from across the United States.

Teams 
The following teams participated:

Pool stage

Pool A
{| class="wikitable" style="text-align: center;"
|-
!width="200"|Team
!width="40"|GP
!width="40"|W
!width="40"|L
!width="40"|T
!width="40"|PF
!width="40"|PA
!width="40"|PD
!width="40"|PTS
|- style="background-color:#ccffcc"
| style="text-align:left;" | Life
|3||3||0||0||103||17||+86||9
|-
| style="text-align:left;" | Northeastern
|3||2||1||0||59||48||+11||7
|- 
| style="text-align:left;" | Wisconsin
|3||1||2||0||48||58||-10||5
|-
| style="text-align:left;" | Colorado State 
|3||0||3||0||17||104||−-87||3
|}

Pool B
{| class="wikitable" style="text-align: center;"
|-
!width="200"|Team
!width="40"|GP
!width="40"|W
!width="40"|L
!width="40"|T
!width="40"|PF
!width="40"|PA
!width="40"|PD
!width="40"|PTS
|- style="background-color:#ccffcc"
| style="text-align:left;" | Arkansas State
|3||3||0||0||79||12||+67||9
|-
| style="text-align:left;" | California
|3||2||1||0||62||22||+40||7
|- 
| style="text-align:left;" | Middlebury
|3||1||2||0||19||74||-55||5
|-
| style="text-align:left;" | North Carolina State
|3||0||3||0||24||76||-52||3
|}

Pool C
{| class="wikitable" style="text-align: center;"
|-
!width="200"|Team
!width="40"|GP
!width="40"|W
!width="40"|L
!width="40"|T
!width="40"|PF
!width="40"|PA
!width="40"|PD
!width="40"|PTS
|- style="background-color:#ccffcc"
| style="text-align:left;" | Central Washington
|3||3||0||0||81||17||+64||9
|- style="background-color:#ccffcc"
| style="text-align:left;" | Kutztown
|3||2||1||0||95||36||+59||7
|- 
| style="text-align:left;" | Texas
|3||1||2||0||34||52||-18||5
|-
| style="text-align:left;" | Virginia
|3||0||3||0||5||110||-105||3
|}

Pool D
{| class="wikitable" style="text-align: center;"
|-
!width="200"|Team
!width="40"|GP
!width="40"|W
!width="40"|L
!width="40"|T
!width="40"|PF
!width="40"|PA
!width="40"|PD
!width="40"|PTS
|- style="background-color:#ccffcc"
| style="text-align:left;" | Navy
|3||3||0||0||59||36||+23||9
|-
| style="text-align:left;" | Dartmouth
|3||2||1||0||62||43||+19||7
|- 
| style="text-align:left;" | Cal Poly SLO
|3||1||2||0||48||43||+5||5
|-
| style="text-align:left;" | Air Force
|3||0||3||0||24||71||-47||3
|}

Pool E
{| class="wikitable" style="text-align: center;"
|-
!width="200"|Team
!width="40"|GP
!width="40"|W
!width="40"|L
!width="40"|T
!width="40"|PF
!width="40"|PA
!width="40"|PD
!width="40"|PTS
|- style="background-color:#ccffcc"
| style="text-align:left;" | St. Mary's
|3||3||0||0||55||34||+21||9
|- style="background-color:#ccffcc"
| style="text-align:left;" | Texas A&M
|3||2||1||0||74||24||+50||7
|- 
| style="text-align:left;" | Western Washington
|3||1||2||0||36||71||-35||5
|-
| style="text-align:left;" | Bowling Green
|3||0||3||0||33||69||-36||3
|}

Pool F
{| class="wikitable" style="text-align: center;"
|-
!width="200"|Team
!width="40"|GP
!width="40"|W
!width="40"|L
!width="40"|T
!width="40"|PF
!width="40"|PA
!width="40"|PD
!width="40"|PTS
|- style="background-color:#ccffcc"
| style="text-align:left;" | Delaware
|3||2||1||0||44||12||+32||7
|-
| style="text-align:left;" | San Diego State
|3||2||1||0||43||40||+3||7
|- 
| style="text-align:left;" | Lindenwood
|3||2||1||0||35||46||-11||7
|-
| style="text-align:left;" | Davenport
|3||0||3||0||26||50||-24||3
|}

Knockout stage

Shield

Bowl

Plate

Cup

Awards
The Tournament MVP was Zac Mizell from Arkansas State University.

The USA Rugby All-Tournament Team consisted of:
Pat Blair (Central Washington)
Garrett Brewer (St. Mary's)
Colton Cariaga (Life)
JP Eloff (Davenport)
Morgan Findlay (Lindenwood)
Dean Gericke (Arkansas State)
Kelly Harris (St. Mary's)
Madison Hughes (Dartmouth)
Jimmy Kowalski (Delaware)
Dominic Mauer (Bowling Green)
Zac Mizell (Arkansas State)
Shaun Potgieter (Arkansas State)

References

2012
2012 in American rugby union
2012 rugby sevens competitions